The Bailiwick of Guernsey is a British crown dependency off the coast of France.

This is a list of holders of the post of Bailiff of Guernsey.

13th century (1 to 9)
 Hugh de Trubleville (1270–1277)
 William de St Remi (1278–1281)
 Raynald de Ashwell (1282–1287)
 William de St Remi (1288–1291)
 William de St Remi (1292–1296)
 Sir Nicholas de Cheney (1297)
 Peter Le Marchant (1298)
 Radulph de Gand (1299)
 Robert Comberwell (1300)

14th century (10 to 39)
 Radulph de Haverland (1301)
 John de Newent (1302)
 Radulph Gaultier (1303)
 Peter Le Marchant (1304)
 Massey de la Court (1305–1309)
 James de Vinchelez (1310)
 Robert Le Gay (1311–1312)
 Walter de la Hogue (1313–1314)
 Massey de la Court (1315–1316)
 Peter Le Marchant (1317)
 Massey de la Court (1318)
 Robert Le Gay (1319)
 Radulph Gaultier (1320)
 John Le Marchant (1321)
 James de Vinchelez (1322)
 William Le Petit (1323)
 William de Souslemont (1324)
 William Le Petit (1325)
 Peter de Garis (1326)
 Henry de St Martin (1327)
 Radulph Le Gay (1328)
 Radulph Cokerel (1329)
 Geoffrey de la Hogue (1330)
 Thomas d'Esterfield (1331)
 Radulph Le Gay (1332–1339)
 John de la Lande (1340–1346)
 John de la Lande (1347–1356)
 John Le Marchant (1357–1383)
 John Nicholas (1384–1386)
 Gervase de Clermont (1387–1411)

15th century (40 to 49)
 James Cocquerel (1412–1432)
 Thomas de la Court (1433–1445)
 John Henry (1446–1447)
 William Cartier (1447–1465)
 Thomas de la Court (1466–1469)
 Peter de Beauvoir (1470–1479)
 Edmund de Cheney (1480–1481)
 Nicholas Fouaschin (1481–1482)
 John Blondel (1483–1498)
 John Martin (1499–1510)

16th century (50 to 57)
 James Guille (1511–1537)
 Thomas Compton (1538–1544)
 John Haryvell (1545–1549)
 Hellier Gosselin (1549–1562)
 Thomas Compton (1562–1570)
 William de Beauvoir (1571–1581)
 Thomas Wigmore (1581–1588)
 Louis de Vic (1588–1600)

17th century (58 to 62)
 Amice de Carteret (1601–1631)
 John de Quetteville (1631–1643)
 Peter de Beauvoir (1644–1651, 1652–1653, 1656–1660)
 Amias Andros (1661–1674)
 Edmund Andros (1674–1713)

18th century (63 to 68)
 John de Sausmarez (1714–1728)
 Josuah Le Marchant (1728–1751)
 Eleazar Le Marchant (1752–1758)
 Samuel Bonamy (1758–1771)
 William Le Marchant (1771–1800)
 Robert Porrett Le Marchant (1800–1810)

19th century (69 to 75)
 Peter de Havilland (1810–1821)
 Daniel de Lisle Brock (1821–1843)
 John Guille (1843–1845)
 Peter Stafford Carey (1845–1883)
 John de Havilland Utermarck (1883–1884)
 Edgar McCulloch (1884–1895)
 Sir Thomas Godfrey Carey Kt., LL.D. (1895–1902), married Eliza de Sausmarez Grassic, daughter of Thomas Ritchie Grassic, of Halifax, N.S. January 22, 1901; he served as Attorney-General of Guernsey, Bailiff of Guernsey, and President of the States of Guernsey

20th century (76 to 87)
 Henry Alexander Giffard (1902–1908)
 William Carey (1908–1915)
 Edward Chepmell Ozanne (1915–1922)
 Havilland Walter de Sausmarez (1922–1929)
 Arthur William Bell (1929–1935)
 Victor Carey (1935–1946)
 Ambrose Sherwill (1946–1959)
 William Arnold (1959–1973)
 John Loveridge (1973–1982)
 Charles Frossard (1982–1992)
 Graham Martyn Dorey (1992–1999)
 de Vic Carey (1999–2005)

21st century (88 to 90)
 Geoffrey Rowland (2005–2012)
 Richard Collas (2012–2020)
 Richard McMahon (2020–)

See also
 List of Governors of Guernsey
 List of Lieutenant Governors of Guernsey
 List of Bailiffs of Jersey
 List of Lieutenant Governors of Jersey

References

 
Guernsey, Bailiffs
Guernsey, Bailiffs
Bailiffs